Chenggu County is a county of Hanzhong, in the southwest of Shaanxi province, China.

History 
Unique archaeological evidence on contacts with Xingan culture (Jiangxi) was found there at Sucun.

Administrative divisions
As 2019, Chenggu County is divided to 2 subdistricts, 15 towns and 1 other.
Subdistricts
 Bowang Subdistrict
 Lianhua Subdistrict

Towns

Others
 Shaanxi Aircraft Manufacturing Company

Climate

Transportation
Chenggu is served by the Yangpingguan–Ankang Railway.

References

 
County-level divisions of Shaanxi
Hanzhong